James Anderton (1932–2022) was a British police officer.

James Anderton may also refer to:

Jim Anderton (James Patrick Anderton, 1938–2018), New Zealand politician
James Anderton (controversialist) (1557–1613), English Catholic
James Anderton (aristocrat) (1557–1618), pro-Catholic author
James Anderton, 4th Baronet of the Anderton Baronets

See also
Anderton (disambiguation)